Dayton Early College Academy, is a school in Dayton, Ohio.  The school is typically referred to by the acronym "DECA." It is a charter school, independent of the Dayton Public Schools. DECA currently serves approximately 1,300 students in grades K-12. The school met eleven of the twelve state indicators for the 2005–2006 school year, earning it a rating of "Excellent" by the Ohio Department of Education.

References

High schools in Dayton, Ohio
Public high schools in Ohio
Public middle schools in Ohio
Charter schools in Ohio
Educational institutions established in 2003
2003 establishments in Ohio